Carl Wilkinson may refer to:

 Carl Wilkinson (darts player), a darts player from England
 Carl Wilkinson (speedway rider), a speedway rider from England